The French destroyer Frondeur was one of 14 s built for the French Navy during the 1920s.

Design and description
The L'Adroit class was a slightly enlarged and improved version of the preceding Bourrasque class. They were powered by two geared steam turbines, each driving one propeller shaft, using steam provided by three du Temple boilers.

The main armament of the L'Adroit-class ships consisted of four Canon de 130 mm Modèle 1924 guns in single mounts, one superfiring pair each fore and aft of the superstructure. Their anti-aircraft armament consisted of a pair of Canon de 37 mm Modèle 1925 guns. The ships carried two above-water triple sets of  torpedo tubes. A pair of depth charge chutes were built into their stern; these housed a total of sixteen  depth charges. In addition two depth charge throwers were fitted for which six  depth charges were carried.

Construction and career
Frondeur was laid down on 9 November 1927,  launched on 20 June 1929 and completed on 20 October 1931.

After France surrendered to Germany in June 1940 during World War II, Frondeur served with the naval force of Vichy France. She was at Casablanca, French Morocco, when Allied forces invaded French North Africa in Operation Torch in November 1942. Resisting the invasion, she was sunk by gunfire from United States Navy ships off Casablanca during the Naval Battle of Casablanca.

Notes

References

 
 

L'Adroit-class destroyers
World War II destroyers of France
1929 ships
Maritime incidents in November 1942